The 1927 Canisius football team was an American football team that represented Canisius College in the Western New York Little Three Conference (Little Three) during the 1927 college football season. Canisius compiled a 7–1 record, shut out five of eight opponents, won the Little Three championship, and outscored all opponents by a total of 173 to 42. Luke Urban was the head coach for the seventh year.

Schedule

References

Canisius
Canisius Golden Griffins football seasons
Canisius football